Bordon is a town in the East Hampshire district of Hampshire, England. The town forms a part of the civil parish of Whitehill which is one of two contiguous villages, the other being Lindford. The civil parish is on the A325, and near the A3 road between London and Portsmouth, from which it is buffered by the rise of the wooded Woolmer Ranges. Bordon is twinned with Condé-sur-Vire in Normandy, France.

Unlike its nearest towns, Petersfield, Farnham and Alton, Bordon has not been a market town, having developed as a military area. Many of the facilities are on or near the A325, a former toll road (turnpike) that connects Farnham to the A3 to its south. Local facilities include The Phoenix Theatre and Whitehill and Bordon Leisure Centre.

Education 
Primary schools in Bordon include Bordon Infant School (bis), Weyford Nursery, Woodlea School and Weyford Primary, as well as secondary education facilities including Oakmoor School on Budds Lane, and Hollywater School, a Special Education establishment. Bordon is also home to the Future Skills Centre, a £3.8 million construction training centre which is part of the Basingstoke College of Technology group.

In November 2019, Mill Chase Academy closed after 60 years, being replaced by Oakmoor School.

History

The town has been an army base with a defunct railway station. Bordon camp was first laid out in 1899 by the Highland Light Infantry, directed by Royal Engineers, and following interruption by the Second Boer War, was occupied by the army from 1903. The first occupants of Quebec barracks were the Somersetshire Light Infantry, returning from South Africa in April, and the 2nd Battalion Devonshire Regiment arrived at St. Lucia Barracks from South Africa in June. Bordon Camp was home to the Canadian Army during both of the world wars and the town is dotted with concrete slabs on which tanks and armoured cars were parked. Bordon is home to the Royal Electrical and Mechanical Engineers (REME), providing trade training, both basic and supplementary, to its soldiers, supported by the School of Electrical and Mechanical Engineers (SEME). The Longmoor Army Ranges, a forest firing range, is south of the town.  Bordon railway station was linked to both the main railway network, and by light railway to the Longmoor Military Railway.

Eco-town proposal
In 2009 the governing Labour administration nationally announced Bordon as one of its tentative Eco-towns in consultative, outline plans. This, dovetailed with the Town Council's 'Green Town Vision', would see the development of Whitehill-Bordon as a carbon-neutral town with sustainable housing and business facilities. The existing Green Town Vision aimed to ensure that all new development of the town would by beneficial to the local environment, and the Eco-town would provide support and funding felt necessary to regenerate the few low standard homes and streets. The proposal initially earmarked 5000 new homes, along with supporting infrastructure, which would require extensive use of greenfield land and reallocation of ex-military land following discontinuance of local military bases.

The scheme was generally supported by the local authority. Local residents objected to the plan's scale and features, citing the road-centric transport network, inevitable net loss of visual amenity, forest, few remaining cultivated fields, scale and diversity of habitats for the remnant Woolmer Forest.  After the announcement of the Eco-town plan, a group of residents formed the Bordon Area Action Group, and opposed the scheme. They argued that the development failed sustainability tests, and claimed that consultation was rigged. Other residents supported the scheme and consultation continued. During the coalition government of 2010-15 its likelihood waned. Funding was cut by half, government looked more critically and skeptically into certain aspects.

The raft of project proposals continues and those awarded funding, such as free public-amenity internet, have been implemented. The Whitehill & Bordon Masterplan was finalised in 2012.

Transport
The town had its own station on the Bordon Light Railway, which was closed in 1966. In 2009, the Association of Train Operating Companies proposed reinstating a rail link with the town, and a feasibility study, concluded in February 2012, was undertaken. The outcome was a plausible link to the existing Alton Line at Bentley, Hampshire, with an estimated cost of £170m.

Bordon and Whitehill are on the A325, which links them to the A3, which passes through the parish, and to Farnham. The town is served by Stagecoach South bus routes. A Tesco-funded bus service around the town ceased due to muted investment.

Places of worship
 Sacred Heart Catholic Church, High Street.
 St Mark's Shared Church, Pinehill Road.

References

External links
 East Hampshire District Council
 Woolmer Forest Heritage Society
 Whitehill Town Council

Towns in Hampshire
Eco-towns